is a Japanese actor/singer. He is well known for his role in Taiyō ni Hoero! and Hide in the Hissatsu series.

Selected filmography

Film
Almost Transparent Blue (1979) as Ryu
Hissatsu: Sure Death (1984) as Hide
W's Tragedy (1984) as Jun Godai
Fireflies in the North (1984) as Denji Masaki
Hissatsu! Braunkan no Kaibutsutachi (1985) as Hide
Hissatsu! III Ura ka Omote ka (1986) as Hide
Sure Death 4: Revenge (1987) as Hide
Godzilla vs. Biollante (1989) as Kirishima Kazuhito
Hissatsu!5 Ōgon no Chi (1991) as Hide
Hissatsu! Mondo Shisu (1996) as Hide
Taiyō no Futa (2016) as Naoto Kan

Television
Hissatsu series
Hissatsu Shigotonin (1979–81) as Kazarushokunin no Hide
Shin Hissatsu Shigotonin (1981–82)
Hissatsu Shigotonin III (1982–83)
Hissatsu Shigotonin IV (1983–84)
Hissatsu Masshigura! (1986)
Hissatsu Shigotonin Gekitotsu (1991–92)
Taiyō ni Hoero!(1982–84) as Masayuki Hara (Gypsy)
Wataru Seken wa Oni Bakari (1991–Present)
Shogun Iemitsu Shinobi Tabi (1991, 1992–93) as Tokugawa Iemitsu
Shōgun no Onmitsu! Kage Jūhachi (1996)
Gō (2011) as Katagiri Katsumoto

Culture Program
 Otona Machiaruki (2009–present)

Selected Discography

Singles
 Imahashire Imaikiru (1980) Insert song of Hissatsu Shigotonin
 Omoideno Itoguruma (1981) Ending song of Shin Hissatsu Shigotonin
 Requiem (1982)
 Kimu (1982)
 Sukitoru Kisetsu (1983)
 Unubore (1983)
 Hokubo (1985)
 Yureru Hitomi (1986) Ending song of Hissatsu Masshigura!
 Otokono Furusato (1990) Ending song of Shogun Iemitsu Shinobi Tabi
 Seishun Ikki (1992) Ending song of Shogun Iemitsu Shinobi Tabi2
 Reimei (1994)
 Love Song (2010)

Albums
 Yagatekimiwa Kisetsunonakahe (1982)
 Hissatsu no Hide (1982)
 Kazeno Akikara (1982)
 Vol.III (1983)
 Selection 12 (1984)
 My Favorite Songs (1984)
 DAY BY DAY (1985)
 MARIKO (1985)
 SOUND TRACK (1985)
 Mitamura Kunihiko Best Selection (1987)
 OLD/NEW (1987)
 Mitamura Kunihiko Zenkyokushu (1988)

References

External links
Kunihiko Mitamura at NHK
Kunihiko Mitamura at Nippon columbia

20th-century Japanese male actors
1953 births
Living people